Pilat is a common surname in Central Europe.  It is spelled simply Pilat in Western countries such as France and Austria, Pilát in Czech and Slovak, and Piłat in Polish.  This may refer to individuals bearing the last name or the name itself.

The Southeast corner of Poland appears to be an ancestral heartland, with Lublin boasting a large number of the nearly 6,879 Poles sharing the surname.  There are two different Piłatka localities in the Mazowsze and Lublin regions.

It is also the name of a natural park near Lyon in France.

Origin
German: from the Saxon word for 'strong sword', or bilihart.  (Bihel = sword or ax.)
French: habitational name from Pilat in Gironde, The Great Dune of Pyla in La Côte-d'Or, and Mont Pilat in Loire.  The name is believed to be derived by one of two tribes of Celtic peoples - the Séguisaves and Allobroges in whose language Pi- = mount and -lat = broad.
Italian: in ancient Rome, a pilum was a throwing spear carried by the legionnaires.  Another theory of Pontius Pilate's origin is that he belonged to the Equestrian class of people.
Slavic (Czech, Slovak and Polish): an individual acting/portraying the character of Pontius Pilate, particularly in a Passion play.  A popular misconception is that, spelling differences aside, the historical figure of Pontius Pilate is somehow the progenitor of this last name.  In actuality, he hailed from a Roman tribe properly called the Pontii?

Derivations

 Pilate
 Pilati
 Pilatz

"Bucket shops" purporting to sell Pilat 'family coats of arms' (a fallacy in terms) often draw spurious connections to those escutcheons (and histories) properly belonging to the counts Pielat, Pilati or Pillot of the Netherlands, Austria and France, respectively.

Persons with the surname Pilat

 Albert Pilát (1903-1974), a Czech botanist and mycologist
Corrado Pilat is an Italian rugby union player.
Ignaz Anton Pilat was the landscape architect for Frederick Law Olmsted to Central Park and an Austrian émigré.
Stanisław Piłat head of the Institute of Technology of Petroleum and Natural Gases and patentholder at Lviv University, Ukraine who was killed by the Nazi secret police during World War II.

References

External links
 Pilat National Park in Loire

Surnames